Bossiaea scortechinii is a species of flowering plant in the family Fabaceae and is endemic to eastern Australia. It is a prostrate to low-lying shrub with simple, elliptic to egg-shaped leaves with the narrower end towards the base, and orange-yellow flowers with red to pinkish markings.

Description

Taxonomy
Bossiaea scortechinii was first formally described in 1883 by Ferdinand von Mueller in the Southern Science Record from specimens collected by Benedetto Scortechini near the Dumaresq River near Stanthorpe.

Distribution and habitat
Bossiaea scortechinii grows in forest on sandy or granitic soils between Miriam Vale in south-eastern Queensland and Inverell in north-eastern New South Wales.

References

scortechinii
Mirbelioids
Flora of New South Wales
Flora of Queensland
Plants described in 1883
Taxa named by Ferdinand von Mueller